In Cambodian politics, Sihanoukism refers to the political ideology of King Norodom Sihanouk. Sihanoukist political parties include the Sangkum Reastr Niyum, FUNCINPEC, and the most recent Community of Royalist People's Party. On 30 June 2006, in a letter to Sisowath Thomico, Sihanouk urged FUNCINPEC and other parties not to use in their writings or statements "Sihanoukism" and "Sihanoukist".

References

Cambodian nationalism
Political ideologies
Eponymous political ideologies
Politics of Cambodia
Norodom Sihanouk